Usolsky District is the name of several administrative and municipal districts in Russia:
Usolsky District, Irkutsk Oblast, an administrative and municipal district of Irkutsk Oblast
Usolsky District, Perm Krai, an administrative and municipal district of Perm Krai

References